Landero y Coss is a Municipality in Veracruz, Mexico. It is located in central zone of the State of Veracruz, about 33 km from state capital Xalapa. It has a surface of 21.39 km2.

The municipality of Landero y Coss is delimited to the north-east by Misantla to the east by Chiconquiaco,  to the south-east by Acatlán, to the south by Miahuatlán and to the west by Tonayan.

It produces principally maize, beans, coffee and green chile.

In Landero y Coss, in June takes place the celebration in honor to San Juan Bautista Patron of the town.

The weather in Landero y Coss is warm all year with rains in summer and autumn.

References

External links 

  Municipal Official webpage
  Municipal Official Information

Municipalities of Veracruz